Barbara Cranmer (1959 or 1960 – May 17, 2019) was a 'Namgis documentary filmmaker. Her works focus on First Nations subjects.

Her 2016 film Our Voices, Our Stories, which won "Best Documentary Short" at the 40th American Indian Film Festival, documents the Canadian Indian residential school system.

Cranmer died of brain cancer.

References 

Year of birth uncertain
2019 deaths
21st-century First Nations people
Canadian documentary film directors
Canadian women film directors
Deaths from brain cancer in Canada
First Nations filmmakers
Kwakwaka'wakw people
Canadian women documentary filmmakers